Merel Blom (born 19 August 1986) is a Dutch Olympic eventing rider. She competed at the 2016 Summer Olympics in Rio de Janeiro where she finished 19th in the individual and 6th in the team competition.

Blom also participated at the 2014 World Equestrian Games and at two European Eventing Championships (in 2011 and 2015). She won a team bronze at the 2014 World Games in Normandy, France.

References

Living people
1986 births
Dutch female equestrians
Equestrians at the 2016 Summer Olympics
Olympic equestrians of the Netherlands
Equestrians at the 2020 Summer Olympics
21st-century Dutch women